Ricciulli is an Italian surname. Notable people with the surname include:

Antonio Ricciulli (1582–1643), Italian Roman Catholic archbishop
Girolamo Ricciulli (1580–1626), Italian Roman Catholic bishop
João Ricciulli (born 1999), Bissau-Guinean footballer

Italian-language surnames
Surnames of Italian origin